Mike Rigoberto Ott (born 2 March 1995) is a professional footballer who plays as an attacking midfielder for Liga 1 club Barito Putera and the Philippines national team.

Personal life
Mike is the younger brother of Manuel Ott who is also an international footballer for the Philippines and also has a twin brother named Marco. Their father is German and their mother is Filipina who is a native of Boracay in Malay, Aklan.

Career

1860 Munich II
Born in Munich, Ott had his youth career at TSV 1860 Munich. On 17 November 2012, he made his debut for the club's reserves in a 2–0 home defeat against Eintracht Bamberg. He scored 12 goals in 25 games for Munich II before joining 1. FC Nürnberg.

1. FC Nürnberg
In April 2014, Ott signed a three-year deal with 1. FC Nürnberg. In 2015–16, after failing to impress at the senior squad, Ott was demoted to Nürnberg's second team.

Angthong
On 25 January 2017, Angthong F.C. of the Thai League 2 announced that they have signed Ott.

Ceres-Negros and United City
In 2018, Ott joined Philippines Football League club Ceres-Negros. He reunited with his brother Manuel who is also a player of Ceres-Negros. In mid-2020, Ceres–Negros became United City, after undergoing a management change in mid-2020 amidst the COVID-19 pandemic. Ott and his brother were re-signed by the club's new owners.

PS Barito Putera
On 4 August 2022, Ott decided to Indonesia and signed a contract with Liga 1 club PS Barito Putera. He made his club debut on 13 August, coming on as a starter in a 1–0 lose against PSS Sleman. Ott give assists a goal by Kahar Kalu Muzakkar in Barito's 5–2 lose over Persib Bandung on 16 September.

On 10 January 2023, Ott scored his first league goal and saved his team from defeat in a 1–1 draw with PSM Makassar. On 14 February, Ott scored a brace for the club in a 4–1 home win against RANS Nusantara.

International career
In June 2013, Ott was called up for the Philippines national team by German coach Michael Weiss for an international friendly against Hong Kong but eventually did not take part.  In late September 2016, he was called up by American coach Thomas Dooley for the October international friendly matches against Bahrain and North Korea as part of their preparation for the 2016 AFF Championship.

He made his debut against Bahrain, coming on as a half-time substitute for Kevin Ingreso and scored the Philippines' only goal within five minutes as they lost 3–1.

International goals
Scores and results list the Philippines' goal tally first, score column indicates score after each Ott goal.

Notes

References

External links
 
 
 
 

1995 births
Living people
German sportspeople of Filipino descent
Footballers from Munich
Citizens of the Philippines through descent
German footballers
Filipino footballers
Filipino people of German descent
Filipino people of Spanish descent
Association football midfielders
Philippines international footballers
2019 AFC Asian Cup players
Regionalliga players
TSV 1860 Munich II players
1. FC Nürnberg II players
Ceres–Negros F.C. players
Mike Ott
PS Barito Putera players
Philippines Football League players
Mike Ott
Liga 1 (Indonesia) players
German expatriate footballers
Filipino expatriate footballers
German expatriate sportspeople in Thailand
Filipino expatriate sportspeople in Thailand
Expatriate footballers in Thailand
German expatriate sportspeople in Indonesia
Filipino expatriate sportspeople in Indonesia
Expatriate footballers in Indonesia